Scary Nights is the ninth extended play by American rapper G-Eazy. It was released on October 18, 2019, by RCA Records. Production was handled by several record producers, including Boi-1da, Charlie Heat, Sevn Thomas, and The Rascals, among others. It features guest appearances from Gunna, French Montana, Moneybagg Yo, Ant Clemons, Preme, Dex Lauper, Miguel, and The Game. The EP charted at number 18 on the US Billboard 200. Music videos were released for "I Wanna Rock", "Hit Licks", and "K I D S", with the first two were directed by Daniel Cz, and "K I D S" were directed by Bryan Allen Lamb.

Track listing

Charts

References

2019 EPs
G-Eazy albums
Albums produced by Boi-1da